Kijów may refer to:
Polish name for Kyiv, the capital of Ukraine
Kijów, Silesian Voivodeship (south Poland)
Kijów, Lubusz Voivodeship (west Poland)
Kijów, Opole Voivodeship (south-west Poland)